Lychnodiscus is a genus of flowering plants belonging to the family Sapindaceae.

Its native range is Western Tropical Africa to Uganda.

Species:

Lychnodiscus brevibracteatus 
Lychnodiscus cerospermus 
Lychnodiscus dananensis 
Lychnodiscus grandifolius 
Lychnodiscus multinervis 
Lychnodiscus papillosus 
Lychnodiscus reticulatus

References

Sapindaceae
Sapindaceae genera